Lupin or lupini beans are the yellow legume seeds of the genus Lupinus. They are traditionally eaten as a pickled snack food, primarily in the Mediterranean basin (L. albus), Latin America (L. mutabilis) and North Africa (L. angustifolius). The most ancient evidence of lupin is from ancient Egypt, dating back to the 22nd century BCE. The bitter variety of the beans are high in alkaloids and are extremely bitter unless rinsed methodically. Low alkaloid cultivars called sweet lupins have been bred, and are increasingly planted.

History and distribution
The earliest archaeological reports on lupins are referred to the Twelfth Dynasty of Egyptian Pharaohs. In their tombs, seeds of Lupinus digitatus Forsk., already domesticated in those times, were discovered. Seven seeds of this species were also retrieved in the tombs of this dynasty dated back to the 22nd century BCE. They are the most ancient evidence of lupin in the Mediterranean.

Lupin is commonly used in Egypt (known by the name "termes") and is eaten by the Egyptians as a main snack during the Sham el-Nessim festival, which is a national festival in Egypt whose history goes back to ancient Egyptian times.

Lupini were used by the Romans, who spread their cultivation throughout the Roman Empire. Today, lupini are most commonly found in Mediterranean countries and their former colonies, especially in Spain, Portugal, Greece, and Brazil, and across the Middle East.

The Andean American variety of this bean, Lupinus mutabilis, was domesticated by pre-Incan inhabitants of present-day Peru. Rock imprints of seeds and leaves, dated around 6th and 7th century BCE, are exhibited in the National Museum of Lima. It was a food widespread during the Incan Empire. Lupins were also used by Native Americans in North America, e.g. the Yavapai people.

Varieties

Some varieties are referred to as "sweet lupins" because they contain much smaller amounts of toxic alkaloids than the "bitter lupin" varieties. Newly bred variants of the narrow-leafed or 'Australian Sweet Lupin' (L. angustifolius) lupins are grown in Australia, Germany and Poland; they lack any bitter taste and require no soaking in salt solution. The seeds are used for different foods from lupin flake, vegan sausages, lupin-tofu, and lupin flour. Given that lupin seeds have the full range of essential amino acids and that they, contrary to soy, can be grown in more temperate to cool climates, lupins are becoming increasingly recognized as a cash crop alternative to soy.

Three Mediterranean species of lupin (blue lupin, white lupin and yellow lupin) are widely cultivated for livestock and poultry feed. Bitter lupins in feed can cause livestock poisoning.

Lupins are currently under widespread cultivation in Australia, Europe, Russia, and the Americas as a green manure, livestock fodder and grazing plant, and high-protein additive for animal and human foods. In Australia, the danger of cross-pollination of the wild bitter and cultivated sweet low-alkaloid variety is understood to be unacceptable when testing reveals the presence of one bitter bean per hundred sweet beans, and a wide quarantine zone is maintained around lupin-growing croplands to prevent wind-blown wild pollen from having a large influence on crop toxicity.

Uses
Lupini beans are commonly sold in a brine in jars (like olives and pickles). They can be eaten by making a small tear in the skin with one's teeth and "popping" the seed directly into one's mouth, but can also be eaten with the skin on. The skin can also be removed by rubbing the bean between forefinger and thumb.

In Egypt, lupin is known by its Egyptian Arabic name "termes" (ترمس), and it is sold by street vendors as well as local markets as a snack, especially during the Sham el-Nessim festival.

The Andean lupin L. mutabilis, the Mediterranean Lupinus albus (white lupin), and Lupinus hirsutus are only edible after soaking the seeds for some days in salted water. In Ecuador, the lupin is often consumed as a ceviche-like street food known as "cevichochos".

Lupin beans can be ground into a flour, and this is widely used in parts of Europe and in Australia as an additive to wheat flour, enhancing the flavour and lending a rich, creamy colour to the resulting foods.

They can also be used as a key ingredient in vegan meat and dairy substitutes. As of 2020, only 4% of lupins were consumed by humans, with the majority used as stock feed. Lupin beans are growing in use as a plant-based protein source in the world marketplace.

Nutrition 
Raw lupin beans are 10% water, 40% carbohydrates, 36% protein, and 10% fat (table). In a 100 gram reference amount, raw lupins supply 370 calories and are moderate-rich sources of B vitamins, especially folate at 89% of the Daily Value (DV) (table). Lupins also contain substantial amounts of dietary minerals, including manganese at 113% DV (table).

Lupins have a thick seed coat (25%) which consists mainly of cellulose (insoluble bran fiber) and is removed as the first step in processing.

Toxicity
Lupin poisoning is a nervous syndrome caused by alkaloids in bitter lupins. Lupin poisoning affects people who eat incorrectly prepared lupin beans. Mediterranean cultures prefer the historic bitter lupin beans with the required toxin-removal by traditional leaching in water preparation methods due to the better flavour that results. Improper preparation of bitter lupins with insufficient soaking allows pharmacologically significant amounts of the anticholinergic alkaloids to remain in the beans, and poisoning symptoms result.

While the alkaloids found in raw and dried beans are bitter and unpalatable to many, with soaking the level is reduced. There are several references in medical literature to poisoning caused by errors in lupini preparation.

Symptoms of lupin bean poisoning (from excess alkaloid in cooked food) include dilated unresponsive pupils, confusion, slowed thought and disorientation, flushed face and/or fever, high heart rate and blood pressure, tremors, difficulty with or slurred speech, in-coordination, dizziness, burning dry mouth, stomach pain, and anxiety or "malaise".

Many human symptoms are described in the Australian government's evaluation of lupin food and livestock fodder export safety standards in the medical literature review section:

Current media describes the symptoms when referring to recent Australian Medical Journal reports of poisoning from overly bitter lupin flour used in foods reported in the media.

According to the Australia New Zealand Food Authority (2001), "data indicates that the mean alkaloid content of marketable sweet lupin seed is on average 130–150 mg/kg." Regarding the daily tolerable intake of alkaloids, it writes, "The only data available on human chronic toxicity are the reports of traditional use of lupini beans in Europe, which indicate a daily dose of 0.35 mg/kg can be tolerated in adults without adverse affects. […] Also, the information applies only to adults, not children, and it is likely that the adult population has developed a certain amount of tolerance to these alkaloids. […] If a safety factor of 10 is applied to account for the uncertainties in the data and particularly to take into account likely human variation, the provisional tolerable daily intake (PTDI) for humans is 0.035 mg/kg/day or 35 μg/kg/day."

A 2017 opinion by the German Federal Institute for Risk Assessment states that "there are no systematic and validated tests for the quality of household kitchen debittering methods", and as a precaution, it recommends that "consumers avoid the consumption of bitter lupin seeds which were not debittered by the manufacturer, as there is no certainty that the recommended debittering procedures result in a sufficient reduction in the levels of health-damaging alkaloids."

Mycotoxic lupinosis is a disease caused by lupin material that is infected with the fungus Diaporthe toxica; the fungus produces mycotoxins called phomopsins, which cause liver damage.

Lupin allergy

Lupin allergy may cause life-threatening anaphylaxis in sensitive individuals. There is some cross-reactivity with peanut allergy, so nut allergy sufferers should exercise extreme caution with lupin-containing food. In the EU, lupin must be listed as an allergen in pre-packed foods where it has been used, but may still be hidden in over-the-counter products. This can be a significant problem for allergy sufferers since breads, pastries, pizzas, pasta, cakes and ice cream are all commonly sold over-the-counter, and all may contain lupin. Lupin has even been found in some tomato ketchup sauces. At present, no desensitization treatments are available, so avoidance is the only advice offered, alongside carrying an epi-pen and anti-histamine/anti-inflammatory medication.

See also
 Lupinus luteus and Lupinus for species and genus information, and for other uses of the lupin bean.

References

External links
 Citation at plants.usda.gov Plant Profile.

Edible legumes
Roman cuisine
Lupinus
Egyptian snack foods

es:Altramuces